Haji Roz-ud-Din  is a Pakistani politician who was a member of the National Assembly of Pakistan from 2008 to 2013.

Political career
He was elected to the National Assembly of Pakistan from Constituency NA-262 (Killa Abdullah) as a candidate of Muttahida Majlis-e-Amal (MMA) in 2008 Pakistani general election. He received 45,590 votes and defeated Malik Muhammad Usman Achakzai, a candidate of Awami National Party (ANP).

References

Living people
Pakistani MNAs 2008–2013
Year of birth missing (living people)